Asparagine-linked glycosylation protein 11  is an enzyme encoded by the ALG11  gene.

See also
 Congenital disorder of glycosylation

References

External links

Further reading